Vorarephilia (often shortened to vore) is a paraphilia characterized by the erotic desire to be consumed by, or to personally consume, another person or creature, or an erotic attraction to the process of eating in general practice. Vore fantasies are separated from sexual cannibalism because the living victim is normally swallowed whole. The word vorarephilia is derived from the Latin  (to "swallow" or "devour"), and Ancient Greek  ("love").

Content 
Usually, vorarephilic fantasies involve a consumer (sometimes called a predator or pred) ingesting one or multiple victims (sometimes called prey) in some way. Since vorarephilic fantasies cannot usually be acted out in reality, they are often expressed in stories or drawings shared on the Internet. 

Vore is most often enjoyed through pictures, stories, videos, and video games, and it can appear in mainstream media. Expressions can involve humans, animals, dragons, giant snakes, and other creatures, real or fictional. In some cases, vorarephilia may be described as a variation of macrophilia and may combine with other paraphilias. Apart from macrophilia, vore fantasies often have themes of BDSM, microphilia, pregnancy fetishism, anthropomorphized animals, and sexual cannibalism.

Variations 
There are several variations to the fantasy, often changing the way the victim is ingested.

Typically when the victim is consumed orally, most of the time it's portrayed as soft vore; the victim is swallowed whole and enters the stomach of the victim, then either is kept there safely, or gets digested inside. If the victim is kept safe (also known as endo vore), the victim can eventually be let out by regurgitation, whereas if digestion happens, the victim is killed, but may be magically reformed.

On the other hand, there's the less commonly seen hard vore, which consists of the victim being chewed and torn apart by the consumer, followed by a more gruesome depiction of digestion. This combination almost always ends in the victim's death.

The sizes of the consumer and/or victim can vary as well. Macro/micro vore consists of either a shrunken victim or a giant consumer, possibly a combination of both. Same-size or larger-victim vore is more common, and often times the enlarged belly of the consumer is described or shown with great care.

Aside from typical oral vore, there are plenty of subcategories. Anal vore consists of the victim being ingested through the anus instead of the mouth, and into the stomach. Unbirth is the ingestion of a victim through the vagina. Cock vore is when the victim is sucked into the penis (which may be depicted as erect and excessively large) and delivered to the scrotum, where it may be transformed into semen. Breast vore consists of the victim being sucked into the breasts, where it may be transformed into breast milk. Besides these main ones listed, there are many other subcategories that may be less commonly seen, but they all more or less amount to a victim being ingested through a consumer's orifice of some kind.

Research 
One case study analysis connected the fantasy with sexual masochism, and suggested that it could be motivated by a desire to merge with a more powerful other or permanently escape loneliness. With "no known treatment" for vorarephiles who feel ill at ease with their sexuality, psychologists at Toronto's Centre for Addiction and Mental Health have recommended trying to "adjust to, rather than change or suppress" the sexual interest. Medication for libido reduction could be used if deemed necessary.

See also
Human cannibalism
Autassassinophilia
Ophidiophilia
Sitophilia

References

External links 
 
 

Paraphilias
Sexual fetishism